1a Palace Gate is a Grade II* listed house on Palace Gate, Kensington in London, England.

Construction of the house began in 1896 and was completed in 1898 by the architect C. J. Harold Cooper for William Alfred Johnstone.

References

1898 establishments in England
Houses completed in 1898
Grade II* listed buildings in the Royal Borough of Kensington and Chelsea
Grade II* listed houses in London
Houses in the Royal Borough of Kensington and Chelsea